is a Japanese former freestyle swimmer. He competed in two events at the 1968 Summer Olympics.

References

External links
 

1945 births
Living people
Japanese male freestyle swimmers
Olympic swimmers of Japan
Swimmers at the 1968 Summer Olympics
Sportspeople from Hiroshima
Asian Games medalists in swimming
Asian Games gold medalists for Japan
Asian Games silver medalists for Japan
Swimmers at the 1966 Asian Games
Medalists at the 1966 Asian Games
Universiade medalists in swimming
Universiade bronze medalists for Japan
Medalists at the 1967 Summer Universiade
20th-century Japanese people